Cheeseville may refer to:

Cheeseville, California
Cheeseville, Wisconsin